Cyborg 009: The Cyborg Soldier is a Japanese anime series based on the manga of the same name written by Shotaro Ishinomori. The series aired on TV Tokyo in Japan from October 14, 2001, to October 13, 2002. The anime was dubbed by Animaze, Inc. and ZRO Limit Productions, and was shortened to its manga name. It aired on Cartoon Network's Toonami from June 30, 2003 to September 26, 2003 with the first 26 episodes before moving to Saturday mornings to air episodes 27 to 42.

The opening theme is "What's the Justice?" by Globe. The first ending theme is "Genesis of Next" by Globe, the second ending theme is "Starting from Here" by Globe and the third ending theme is "I Do" by Fayray.

Episode list

References

Cyborg 009: The Cyborg Soldier
Cyborg 009